Statistics of Second Division Football Tournament in the 2009 season.

Stadiums
Matches were played at 2 venues; Henveiru Football Ground and Maafannu Turf Ground.

Teams
Twelve teams compete in the league – top 2 teams qualify to play in the 2010 Dhivehi league play-off and bottom 2 teams will be relegated to Third division.

League table

Source: Haveeru Sports(C) Champion; (P) Promoted; (R) Relegated.

Results

Awards

Notes

  Vyansa gained promotion to the 2010 Dhivehi League after winning second in the 2010 Dhivehi league play-off.

References

Maldivian Second Division Football Tournament seasons
Maldives
Maldives
2